Pipli is a village in Gaighata CD Block in Bangaon subdivision of North 24 Parganas district, West Bengal, India.

Geography
The village is near the Ichamati River which is the border between India and Bangladesh. Pipli has two primary schools.

Gaighata CD Block has a border of 21.72 km, of which 15 km is unfenced (as of May 2018).

Demographics
In the 2011 Census of India, Pipli had a total population of 1,808, of which 917 (51%) were males and 891 (49%) were females. Population below 6 years was 136. The total number of literates in Pipli was 1402 (83.85% of the population over 6 years).

Most of the people of the village are dependent on agriculture. They cultivate rice, wheat, jute, sesame seed, mustard seed, different types of vegetables, and marigold.

Transport
The Jhaudanga-Pipli-Tentulberia Road serves the border area. 
Only 3 Wheeler Auto-rickshaws(from Jhowdanga to Tentulberia ) available  for going to Pipli.
 Most important thing is that You are requested to keep Photo ID Card( Specially Voter ID card) with you when you are traveling to Pipli because there are two BSF check post on the way.

References

Villages in North 24 Parganas district